David Guy Myers (born 20 September 1942) is a professor of psychology at Hope College in Michigan, United States, and the author of 17 books, including popular textbooks entitled Psychology, Exploring Psychology, Social Psychology and general-audience books dealing with issues related to Christian faith as well as scientific psychology. In addition, he has published chapters in over 60 books and numerous scholarly research articles in professional journals.  Myers is widely recognized for his research on happiness and is one of the supporters of the positive psychological movement.

Myers was born in Seattle, Washington and graduated from Seattle's Queen Anne High School in 1960. He attended Whitworth University, from which he received his B.A. in chemistry magna cum laude in 1964, having been a pre-med student. However, his graduate work went in a different direction, that of social psychology. He received his M.A. in social psychology in 1966 and his Ph.D. in social psychology the following year for thesis titled Enhancement of Initial Risk Taking Tendencies in Social Situations, both at the University of Iowa.

Myers has spent most of his career at Hope College, rising from assistant professor (1967), associate professor (1970), and since 1975, full professor. He served as a visiting scholar at the University of Mannheim in Germany in the summer of 1974, and at the University of St Andrews in Scotland in 1985.

Myers has received fellowships and grants from the U.S. Public Health Service and the National Science Foundation and is a fellow of the American Psychological Association, the American Psychological Society and the American Association of Applied and Preventive Psychology. He is one of the most important authors of psychology textbooks and is the recipient of honorary doctorates from three different educational institutions. According to the Open Syllabus Project, Myers is the most frequently cited author on college syllabi for psychology courses.

Books

Textbooks 
Psychology (with C. Nathan Dewall, 13th edition, 2020) 978-1319132101
Exploring Psychology (with C. Nathan DeWall, 11th edition, 2019) 978-1319104191
Psychology in Everyday Life (with C. Nathan DeWall, 5th edition, 2019) 978-1319133726
Social Psychology (with Jean Twenge, 13th edition, 2018) 978-1260397116
Social Psychology (with Jean Twenge and others, 8th Canadian edition, 2021) 978-1260327014
Exploring Social Psychology (with Jean Twenge, 9th edition, 2020) 978-1260254112
Myers' Psychology for the AP® Course (with C. Nathan DeWall, 3rd edition, 2018) 978-1319070502

Other Books 
Psychology Through the Eyes of Faith (2002) 978-0060655570
The Pursuit of Happiness: Who Is Happy--and Why (1992)978-1855382732
A Quiet World: Living with Hearing Loss (2000) ASIN: B001CEU7BU
The American Paradox: Spiritual Hunger in an Age of Plenty (2000) 978-0300091205
Psychology Through the Eyes of Faith (2002) with Malcolm A. Jeeves
Intuition: Its Powers and Perils (2002) 978-0300103038
What God Has Joined Together:  The Christian Case for Gay Marriage (with Letha Dawson Scanzoni, 2005) 978-0060834548
A Friendly Letter to Skeptics and Atheists:  Musings on Why God is Good and Faith isn't Evil (2008) 978-0470290279
How Do We Know Ourselves?: Curiosities and Marvels of the Human Mind (2022) 9780374601959

References

External links
David G. Myers's web site
Defining Wisdom: A Project of The University of Chicago Arete Initiative
A Science of Virtues: A Project of The University of Chicago Arete Initiative

1942 births
Living people
21st-century American psychologists
American Protestants
Social psychologists
People from Holland, Michigan
American textbook writers
American male non-fiction writers
Fellows of the American Psychological Association
Hearing loss
20th-century American psychologists